The 2019–20 FIM Endurance World Championship was the 41st season of the FIM Endurance World Championship, a motorcycle racing series co–organised by the Fédération Internationale de Motocyclisme (FIM) and Eurosport. The season started at the Bol d'Or on the 21 September 2019 and ended with the 12 Hours of Estoril on the 27 September 2020.

Calendar
The calendar for the 2019–2020 season was released on 18 July 2019.

Calendar changes
The 8 Hours of Slovakia Ring was replaced by the new 8 Hours of Sepang.
Due to the coronavirus, the Oschersleben round was cancelled, and Le Mans and Suzuka were postponed to a later date.
The 2020 Bol d'Or was included in the updated calendar.
Further calendar changes saw the 2020 Bol d'Or & Suzuka 8 Hours cancelled. The former was replaced by the 12 Hours of Estoril.

Results and standings

Race results
Bold indicates the overall race winner.

Championship standings
Points systems

EWC Team's World Championship

EWC Manufacturer's World Championship

Superstock Team's World Cup

Superstock Manufacturer's World Cup

Independent Team's Championship

References

External links 

2019
2019 in motorcycle sport
2020 in motorcycle sport